Dum aloo (also spelled as dam aloo) or aloor dum or aloo dum is a potato-based curry dish. Dum means slow-cooked, and aloo is potato. It is a part of the traditional  Kashmiri Pandit cuisine, from the Kashmir Valley, in the Indian state of Jammu and Kashmir. There are also Banarasi and Bengali variations.

Preparation
The potatoes, usually smaller ones, are first skinned and deep fried. Kashmiri dum aloo sauce is made with yogurt or khoya, and often includes a cashew nut paste. The Banarasi variation sauce is made from tomatoes and onions. Spices such as red chilies, garlic, ginger, cardamom, and fennel are added to the sauce.  The potatoes are cooked slowly at low flame in the sauce, and can be garnished with coriander. Dum aloo is often paired and served with naan.

See also

 List of potato dishes

References 

Kashmiri cuisine
Indian cuisine
Potato dishes
Curry dishes
Deep fried foods
Bengali cuisine
Odia cuisine